Theotokis (Theotókēs), in Italian and older English literature Theotochi or Teotochi, is a Greek aristocratic family from Corfu.

History 
The family are an old landowning family in Corfu, Greece, several members of which have been prominent politicians.  They originally hailed from Constantinople, whence they fled following its fall to the Ottomans, eventually settling in Corfu. The painter El Greco (Domenico Theotokopoulos) was descended from a branch of the same family that fled to Crete. The Corfiote branch was ennobled by the Republic of Venice and was entered in the Libro d'Oro; they used to be commonly referred to as Counts (Cónte), but their titles lapsed when the Ionian islands became part of the Kingdom of Greece, which did not recognise noble titles.  

As the family prospered, nicknames were devised to distinguish between the various male-line Theotokis. The Greek genealogist  distinguished the following branches:
 The Calocardarei (Καλοκαρδαρέοι) or Spilia (της Σπηλιάς, "of the cave"), from a quarter of the city of Corfu where they resided. Its members bore the title of count.
 The Stathachi (Σταθάκοι) or del Santo (του Αγίου, "of the Saint"), due to the proximity of their residence to the church of Corfu's patron, Saint Spyridon. Its members bore the title of baron.
 The Sclebuni (Σκλεμπούνοι)
 The Zammarco (Ζαμμάρκο, του Σαν Μάρκο), from Saint Mark (San Marco in Italian), the patron of Venice.
 The D'Aviazzo (Νταβιάτζο) or Politikoí (Πολιτικοί), who became a distinguished political dynasty in Greece.
 The Andrucelli (Ανδρουτσέλλοι). Its members bore the title of count.

Notable members

Calocardarei branch 
This branch received the title of count in the primogeniture by Charles III Ferdinand, Duke of Mantua. On 10 October 1796, the Doge of Venice, Ludovico Manin extended the title to all members of the family.
 Alexander Theotokis (Αλέξανδρος Θεοτόκης, 1516–1600), soldier, fought in the Siege of Corfu (1537), taken captive by the Ottomans until ransomed in 1573, later provedditore in Venetian service.
 Nicholas Theotokis, son of George (Νικόλαος Γ. Θεοτόκης, died 1603), nephew of the above, Venetian governor of Parga in 1591 
 Nicholas Theotokis, son of Mark (Νικόλαος Μ. Θεοτόκης, 1631–1686), grandson of the above, as reward for his service during the War of Candia, in 1699 his descendants received the title of count. 
 Count George Theotokis (Γεώργιος Θεοτόκης, 1677–1734), soldier and statesman, son of the above, fought at the Siege of Corfu (1716) with his brothers Mark and Giambattista. 
 Count Nicholas-Alvise Theotokis (Νικόλαος Αλοΐσιος Θεοτόκης, 1702–1762), son of the above, ambassador to Venice from 1746 
 Count  (Σπυρίδων Γεώργιος Θεοτόκης, 1722–1803), son of the above, president of the Ionian Senate and head of state of the Septinsular Republic with the title of Prince 
 Countess Isabella Teotochi Albrizzi, daughter of Anthony (Ισαβέλλα Θεοτόκη-Αλμπρίτζι, Corfu 1760 – Venice 1836), niece of the above, writer and art lover, held a notable literary salon at Venice 
 Count Alvise Theotokis (Αλοΐσιος Θεοτόκης, 1766–1828), brother of the previous 
 Count Mark-Alvise Theotokis, son of Spyridon  (Μάρκος-Αλοΐσιος Θεοτόκης, 1824–1912), grandson of the above, historian and director of the Senate archives at Corfu 
  (Κωνσταντίνος Θεοτόκης, 1872–1923), son of the above, writer of the Heptanese School.
 Dimitrios Theotokis (Δημήτριος Θεοτόκης, 1874–1923), brother of the above, officer, fought in the Asia Minor Campaign as commander of the Independent Division.
 Spyridon Theotokis (Σπυρίδων Θεοτόκης, 1876–1940), brother of the above, historian, director of the Senate archives at Corfu and of the Archives of Venice

Stathachi branch 
This branch received the title of baron in primogeniture by Napoleon I on 7 February 1812
 Nikephoros Theotokis (Νικηφόρος Θεοτόκης, Corfu 1731 – Moscoe 1800), theologian and philosopher, important figure of the Greek Enlightenment, archbishop of Astrakhan and Stavropol 
 Baron , son of Eustathios (Εμμανουήλ Θεοτόκης, 1777–1837), nephew of the above, president of the Ionian Senate, named baron by Napoleon I in 1812, awarded a knighthood by the British in 1818
 Baron Andreas Theotokis (Ανδρέας Θεοτόκης, 1802–1889), son of the above, scholar and deputy of the Ionian Assembly

D'Aviazzo branch 
  (Ιωάννης Βαπτιστής Θεοτόκης, 1777–1865), member of the Filiki Etaireia, senator and minister in the Kingdom of Greece 
 Spyridon Theotokis (Σπυρίδων Θεοτόκης, 1811–1870), son of the above, married in 1841 the English writer Jane Digby 
 , son of Nicholas-Andreas (Μιχαήλ Θεοτόκης, 1842–1916), nephew of the above, mayor of Corfu (1887–1895), MP (1902–1915) and Speaker of the Hellenic Parliament (1916) 
 Georgios Theotokis (Γεώργιος Θεοτόκης, 1844–1919), brother of the above, four times Prime Minister of Greece between 1899 and 1909 
 Nikolaos Theotokis (Νικόλαος Θεοτόκης, 1878–1922), son of the above, politician, executed after the Trial of the Six
 Ioannis Theotokis commonly called John (Ιωάννης [Τζόν] Θεοτόκης, 1880–1961), brother of the above, Prime Minister of Greece in 1950
 Spyros Theotokis (Σπύρος Θεοτόκης, 1908–1980), son of the above, politician
 Elisabeth (Lulu) Theotoky (Ελισάβετ Θεοτόκη, 1924-2013), daughter of the above, choreographer and researcher
  Joanna Poyago-Theotoky (Ιωάννα (Τζοάννα) Πογιάγο-Θεοτόκη),  daughter of the above, Professor of economics
 George Theotoky (Γεώργιος Θεοτόκης, 1926-2021), businessman
 Zaïra Ralli, née Theotoki (Ζαΐρα Θεοτόκη-Ράλλη), sister of Nikolaos and John, wife of Prime Minister Ioannis Rallis, mother of Prime Minister Georgios Rallis

References 

Greek noble families
Theotokis family